Website governance  is an organization's structure of staff and the technical systems, policies and procedures to maintain and manage a website. Website governance applies to both Internet and Intranet sites.

Areas of responsibility
Governance of a website may include a wide variety of responsibilities, including online strategy, budgeting, systems and software administration, hosting, online marketing and communications, e-commerce, customer service, business development, online community and social media, web content development and workflows, content strategy, translation, website graphic design, user experience (analysis/design), information/data architecture, website analytics, security, archiving, outsourcing, accessibility, legal issues (for example, copyright, DRM, trademark, and privacy), information ethics, and training, among others. These areas may be the responsibility of several or single staff within an organization, depending on available resources and infrastructure, organizational needs and objectives, website size, and how content is managed and delivered. McGovern argues that there is a limit to the number of web pages that can be professionally managed by one person, although he does not set the outer limit, either in number of pages (in a centralized model of website governance) or in number of publishers (in a decentralized model of website governance).

Website management team
A website management team (WMT) can be defined as an authorizing body of a website responsible for setting and achieving high-level goals for a site. This body includes content owner stakeholders and site production staff. In some organizations, a chief web officer leads the WMT.
Responsibilities and authorities of website staff may be grouped by strategic, tactical and operational roles, and may be organized as a cross-functional web team. A strategic site sponsor articulates the high-level vision of the site, and determines if the vision is adequately fulfilled; a tactical-level staff translates the vision into detail by prioritizing projects, specifying site design and negotiating placement of content. The tactical staff may be a group serving on a website governance board or steering team representing the main constituencies as defined by the organization's overall business plan.

Governance models
Several models of website governance exist. Authors have focused on the content lifecycle; primary components, such as people, process, and standards; attributes, such as accountability, accessibility, participation across business areas, and standards; and type of governance structure (centralized, decentralized, or federated).

Through the Federal Web Managers Council, Federal agencies in the U.S. government collaborate to share common challenges, ideas, and best practices and improve the online delivery of U.S. government information and services. Harrison, the first co-chair of the Federal Web Managers Council, has proposed the 5 "R's" of web governance: Roles, Responsibilities, Relationships, Rules, and Review.

In a 2008 report, the United Nations Joint Inspection Unit reviewed the management of websites in United Nations system organizations and made eight recommendations to improve a website presence. These included website governance, strategy, and policies and guidelines; content management systems; and staffing, training, and funding.

In 2011 Jacoby introduced the Website Governance Functional Model. Based on a business reference model within Davenport's information ecology, the Website Governance Functional Model included at least 16 functional areas within an organization, along with the principles of project, information, and knowledge management. In this article he also introduced the concept "the website is the organization."

In 2012 Jacoby introduced the Website Governance Modeling Tool, "designed to help Web managers and their stakeholders conceptualize and assess their organization's website governance."

See also
Content audit
Content inventory
Design methods
Information technology governance
Internet governance
Project governance
Web archiving
Web content lifecycle
Web content management system
Web design
World Wide Web

References

Further reading

External links 
Web Governance LinkedIn group
Usability.gov
Howto.gov Web Content channel
Website Governance Modeling Tool

Website management
Information technology governance